Besshø or Besshøe is a mountain in Vågå Municipality in Innlandet county, Norway. The mountain is surrounded by several other notable mountains including Kollhøin to the north, Veslfjellet and Besseggen to the southeast, Bukkehåmåren and Eggi to the south, and Gloptinden to the west.

The mountain lies right above the lake Bessvatnet, along the Besseggen hiking trail. On the mountain's north-eastern side a small cirque glacier, and is surrounded by a large ice-cored moraine, a relatively rare feature in Norway.

From Besseggen there is a nice view over the lakes Gjende and Bessvatnet. Gjende is about 400 m lower than Bessvatnet. While Bessvatnet has a blue colour common to lakes, Gjende has a green colour due to glacier runoff depositing clay into the lake (rock flour).

Toponymy
The mountain is named after the lake Bessvatnet, the last element is the finite form of hø for "large and round mountain".

See also
List of mountains of Norway by height

References

Jotunheimen
Vågå
Mountains of Innlandet